Al-Fosfat Sport Club, is an Iraqi football team based in Al-Obaidi, Al-Anbar, that plays in Iraq Division Two.

Managerial history
 Omar Samir Al-Shammari
 Waleed Motlag

See also 
 2001–02 Iraq FA Cup
 2021–22 Iraq FA Cup

References

External links
 Al-Fosfat SC on Goalzz.com
 Iraq Clubs- Foundation Dates

1991 establishments in Iraq
Association football clubs established in 1991
Football clubs in Al-Anbar